The West Point Camporee is an annual invitational camping event sponsored by the United States Military Academy at West Point, New York.  It attracts Scout units, from over a dozen states, along the east coast of the United States; from over 75 different Scout councils. It's one of the largest annual Scouting events held in the country.  The event consists of a weekend campout on the Academy property with static and active displays, competitions, demonstrations, and a trading post.  Attendees report that it's exclusively run by the Cadets.

Organization
West Point Camporee is managed by an organization called the Scoutmasters' Council.  The first "Camporee" was in 1961. Camporee grew out of a discussion among cadets who attended the 1960 National Jamboree.  That first camporee featured five area troops.  The first patch for attending was the 1963 Camporee.  Camporee is nominally held the first week in May; however, since 2001, dates are adjusted to around the Academy's schedule.  The Invitational nature reflects the priority for a Cadet to invite their "home" Boy Scout Troop, Venturing Crew, Sea Scout Ship, Varsity Crew, Explorer Post (Boy Scouts of America (BSA)), or Girl Scout Troop (Girl Scouts of the USA (GSUSA)).  If all of the available slots are not filled by home organizations of the Cadets; then, a lottery is held for other Scout units. Participants in the lottery indicate that they usually receive an invitation about once in every five years.

The memorabilia for the Camporee has been analyzed in a series of articles and are published by "Scouting Memorabilia," a collector's magazine that's published quarterly by the Lawrence L. Lee Scouting Museum and Max I. Silber Library, in Manchester, N.H.

Each attending organization may choose to attend the Camporee as a "Lightfighter" or "Mechanized" troop. Lightfighter troops must backpack all of their gear three miles through the not so small hills surrounding West Point to the Camporee site. Those who complete the trek earn the "I Hiked Bull Hill" pin and a Lightfighter patch.

Mechanized troops are shuttled directly to the Camporee site and are permitted to bring one vehicle containing their gear. However they do not earn the Bull Hill pin nor the Lightfighter patch.

Various items commemorating these events have been issued starting with Troop Streamers (for attachment to the Unit Flags in 1961 and 1962), patches for uniform wear (starting 1963), neckerchiefs (starting 1970), mugs, pillows, pins, neckerchief slides, coins, t-shirts, sweatshirts, as well as "Brass", which are pins that the Cadets have.

The official patch each year, at least in recent history is an artistic variant of an Army unit patch.
For instance, the is from the 1st Armored Division "Old Ironsides" unit patch.

The camporee offers competitions in a variety of events like Tactical Challenge, Grenade Toss,  Camouflage, Wilderness Survival, First Aid and more.

Attendance was cited in the 1977 Annual Report of the Superintendent as 3,000. At least one United States Postal Service First Day Cover was issued in 1985 honoring Brigadier General Sylvanus Thayer, an early superintendent of West Point.

for cite to Scoutmaster Council articles appearing in Lawrence L. Lee and Max I Silber Museum reference:

R.James Steiner, “West Point Camporee Memorabilia, PART II,” 
40 Scout Memorabilia No. 3, 2-5 (Sept. 2005);
	
R.James Steiner, “West Point Camporee Memorabilia, PART I,” 
40 Scout Memorabilia No. 1, 1-5 (March 2005); and
	
R.James Steiner, “West Point Camporees and Memorabilia,” 
26 Scout Memorabilia No. 3, 1-9 (May 1991).

References

External links

http://www.army.mil/article/55963/Annual_Camporee_connects_West_Point_cadets_with_scouts
 Scoutmasters' Council
 48th Annual West Point Camporee
 Scoutmasters' Council What We Do

Boy Scouts of America
United States Military Academy
1961 establishments in New York (state)
Recurring events established in 1961